Monster Garage is a video game based on the TV show of the same name developed by Invictus Games and released by Activision Value for Windows and Xbox in 2004.

Reception 
Monster Garage received generally unfavorable reviews according to website Metacritic. GameSpot panned it, saying that the "lack of any strategy to the gameplay, a generally poor design, and an endless number of stability problems turn Monster Garage into a real monster". GameZone says it might have some appeal for the fantasy of building vehicles, but "the time spent unscrewing bolts is disproportionately large compared to the time testing your creation".

References

External links

2004 video games
Simulation video games
Racing video games
Activision games
Video games based on television series
Video games developed in Hungary
Video games set in the United States
Windows games
Xbox games